Sakyō (左京, "the left side of the capital") refers to the area east of Suzaku Avenue, the central avenue in the ancient capitals of Japan, especially Kyoto.

It may also refer to:

Sakyo-ku, Kyoto
Sakyoshiki, the administrator of Sakyo. It was an old government post established by the Ritsuryo system.
Names derived from Sakyoshiki
 Sakyo Komatsu, a Japanese science fiction writer
 Sakyo, a YuYu Hakusho character

See also 
Ukyo (disambiguation)